Schmiegel is the former German name of Śmigiel, a town in Poland.

Schmiegel may also refer to:
Kreis Schmiegel, a former German kreis (county) with the seat at Schmiegel 
Klaus Schmiegel (born 1939), organic chemist, inventor of prozac

See also
 
 Smigel
 Śmigiel (disambiguation)